Minister of Construction and Public Works of Angola is a cabinet level position in the national government. The position was established in 1975 with Manuel Resende de Oliveira.

Name changes
 1975–1980: Minister of Construction and Housing

Ministers of Construction and Public Works
 1975–1978: Manuel Resende de Oliveira
 1978–1980: Horacio Pereira Brás da Silva
 1980–1983: Manuel Alves dos Passos Barroso Mangueira
 1983–1986: Jorge Henrique Varela de Melo Dias Flora
 1986–1991: João Henriques Garcia Cabelo Branco
 1992–1996: Mateus Morais de Brito Júnior
 1996–1997: Pedro de Castro Van Dúnem
 1998–2001: António Henriques da Silva
 2001–2010: Francisco Higino Lopes Carneiro
 2010: José dos Santos da Silva Ferreira
 2010–2013: Fernando Alberto Soares da Fonseca
 2013–2016: Waldemar Pires Alexandre
 2016–2017: Artur Carlos Andrade Fortunato
 2017–present: Manuel Tavares de Almeida

References

External links

Construction
Construction Ministers
Politics of Angola